Za'tara (Arabic: زعترة، نابلس) is a Palestinian village located in the Nablus Governorate in the northern West Bank. It about 18 km south of Nablus city. Since the Six-Day War in 1967, it has been under Israeli occupation. It is located in Beita, Nablus, municipality services.

References

External links 

 Survey of Western Palestine, Map 14:   IAA, Wikimedia commons
 Beita Town Profile (including Za’tara Locality), Applied Research Institute–Jerusalem (ARIJ)

Villages in the West Bank
Nablus Governorate